KDN may refer to:
 Naval Aircraft Modification Unit KDN Gorgon
 KDN (San Francisco), an AM radio station licensed from 1921 to 1923